is a former Japanese football player.

Playing career
Kano was born in Chiba Prefecture on April 4, 1977. After graduating from Senshu University, he joined the J2 League club Ventforet Kofu in 2000. He played many matches as substitute in 2000 and became a regular player as defensive midfielder in 2001. In 2002, he became a regular player as a right side back, but he rarely played during that summer and retired at the end of the 2002 season.

Club statistics

External links

1977 births
Living people
Senshu University alumni
Association football people from Chiba Prefecture
Japanese footballers
J2 League players
Ventforet Kofu players
Association football defenders